The 2018 CS Inge Solar Memorial – Alpen Trophy was held in November 2018 in Innsbruck, Austria. It is part of the 2018–19 ISU Challenger Series. Medals will be awarded in the disciplines of men's singles, ladies' singles, pair skating, and ice dancing.

Entries 
The International Skating Union published the list on entries on October 15, 2018.

Changes to preliminary assignments

Results

Men

Ladies

Pairs 
Note: For this category, the 2018 Inge Solar Memorial – Alpen Trophy will be considered as an International Competition only, since the minimum number of entries for a Challenger Series was not reached. In pairs skating, the minimum number of entries is five entries from at least three ISU Members.

Ice dancing

References

External links
 2018 Inge Solar Memorial / Alpen Trophy at the International Skating Union

Inge Solar Memorial / Alpen Trophy
2018
2018 in Austrian sport
Sports competitions in Innsbruck